Trisetopsis is a genus of flowering plants belonging to the family Poaceae.

Its native range is Nigeria to Eritrea and Southern Africa, Madagascar, Arabian Peninsula, China to Tropical Asian Mountains.

Species:
 Trisetopsis angusta (C.E.Hubb.) Röser & A.Wölk 
 Trisetopsis arcta (Cope) Röser & A.Wölk

References

Poaceae
Poaceae genera